Theodore Albrecht (born September 24, 1945) is a music historian who specializes in the life and music of Ludwig van Beethoven.

Biography
Albrecht was born in Jamestown, New York, and grew up in San Antonio, Texas. He is a 1967 graduate of St. Mary's University in San Antonio (B.M.E., music education) and of North Texas State University (now University of North Texas) in Denton, Texas in 1969 (M.M., musicology and music literature) and 1975 (Ph.D., musicology and history).

After teaching at various colleges across the United States, Albrecht joined the faculty of Kent State University in 1992.

Albrecht's scholarly papers have been published in various music journals such as Journal of the Conductor's Guild and The Beethoven Journal, including evidence that the degree of Beethoven's hearing loss was not as absolute as previously believed.

Albrecht has lectured before performances of various music ensembles, notably the Cleveland Orchestra and Opera Cleveland.

Bibliography
 Volume 1: ; Volume 2: ; Volume 3: 
 Volume 1:  (2018); Volume 2:  (2019); Volume 3:  (2020); Volume 4:  (2022)

References

External links

Texas classical music
Beethoven scholars
1945 births
Living people
American music historians
American male non-fiction writers
St. Mary's University, Texas alumni
University of North Texas College of Music alumni